Leopoldo Marco Antonio Caldani (1725–1813) was an Italian anatomist and physiologist.

Caldani was born in Bologna, Italy. He studied medicine in Bologna, receiving his degree in 1750, and became a professor of practical medicine in 1755.  Caldani left to become professor of theoretical medicine at Padua, and in 1771 became professor of anatomy, retiring in 1805.

He was a champion of Haller's theory of irritability and was noted for experimental studies on the function of the spinal cord and for the introduction of electricity in the physiology of the nerves. His most celebrated work is his anatomical atlas, in which he was aided by his nephew Floriano. He died in Padua, Italy in 1813.

Works

 "Sull' intensività et irritabilità di alune parti degli animali" (Bologna, 1757)
 "Lettera sopra l'irritabilità et insensività Halleriana" (Bologne, 1759)
 "Lettera sull'uso del muschio nella idrofobia" (Venice, 1767)
 "Esame del capitolo settimo dell'ultima opera di Antonio de Haen" (Padua, 1770)
 "Innesto felice del vajuolo" (Padua, 1768)
 "Institutiones pathologicae" (Padua, 1772, 1776; Leyden, 1784; Venice, 1786; Naples, 1787), translated into German by Reuss (1784), and issued at Prague (1793), in connection with "Institutiones physiologicae"; "Dialoghi di fisiologia e di pathologia" (Padua, 1778, 1793)
 "Institutiones physiologicae" (Padua, 1773, 1778; Leyden, 1784; Venice, 1786; Naples, 1787)
 "Institutiones semeioticae" (Padua, 1808)
 "Icones anatomicae" with 5 vols. of "Explicatio iconum" (Venice, 1801–13)

References

1725 births
1813 deaths
Italian anatomists